Rock the World is the debut studio album by Swedish girl group Bubbles, released in 2000.

Track listing
"I'll Be There (Oh La La)"
"Rock the World"
"My Boyfriend"
"I Have a Dream"
"(I'm a) Happy Girl"
"One 2 Six"
"Disco San Francisco"
"Most of the Time"
"New Generation" (Feat. Dr. No)
"Viva the Sun"
"X-Mas Time"
Bonus tracks
"I'll Be There" (Karaoke version)
"I Have a Dream" (Karaoke version)
"Rock the World" (RNT version)

Personnel
Caroline Ljungström (lead vocals)
Sandra Joxelius (lead vocals)
Patricia Joxelius (lead vocals)
Yenny Andersén (minor vocals)
Hannah Steffenburg (minor vocals)

Charts

References

2000 albums
Bubbles (band) albums